This article is a list of diseases of rapeseed and canola (Brassica napus and B. rapa or B. campestris).

Bacterial diseases

Fungal diseases

Viral diseases

Phytoplasmal diseases

Miscellaneous diseases and disorders

References
Common Names of Diseases, The American Phytopathological Society

Canola